Isaac Kappy (February 17, 1977 – May 13, 2019) was an American actor, musician, and conspiracy theorist. He had roles in the films Thor (2011) and Terminator Salvation (2009) and in the AMC television series Breaking Bad. He was a member of the band Monster Paws.

Career
Kappy made his feature film debut as a hustler in the movie Beerfest (2006). He would go on to act in the movies Not Forgotten, Fanboys, Terminator Salvation, Saint John of Las Vegas (all 2009), Klown Kamp Massacre (2010), Lemonade Mouth, Thor, and 10 Years (all 2011), and the television series Breaking Bad, The Night Shift, and Rachel Dratch's Late Night Snack.

As a musician, Kappy played in the band Charles McMansion with Tom Sandoval. The group released one recording, the song "T.I.P." (an acronym for Touch In Public), and appeared on the reality show Vanderpump Rules.

Kappy appeared as a guest on Alex Jones' radio show InfoWars in August 2018, on which he accused multiple movie stars of pedophilia as part of the QAnon conspiracy theory, which involves a cabal of Satan-worshipping child molesters who run a global child sex-trafficking ring. During the broadcast, Jones asked Kappy to be more circumspect and avoid "getting into names", while Kappy briefly insisted Jones was "gaslighting" him by querying his claims. In early January 2021, American lawyer and conspiracy theorist Lin Wood alluded to QAnon when he tweeted without evidence that Kappy had been involved in a wide-ranging attempt to reveal a massive child sexual abuse ring involving Chief Justice of the US Supreme Court John Roberts.

Legal issues
In 2018, Kappy was investigated by police after reportedly threatening actress Paris Jackson and actor Seth Green. Jackson accused Kappy of choking her at a party they were both attending. The Los Angeles Police Department (LAPD) confirmed an investigation, but said it was not active.

Death
In 2019, Kappy committed suicide by jumping from a bridge into oncoming traffic in Arizona. Around the time of his death, a lengthy note was posted on his Instagram account, in which he opened up about his drug and alcohol abuse, and apologized to Jesus Christ, Donald Trump, and QAnon. The post was captioned, "Beware the man that has nothing to lose, for he has nothing to protect".

Partial filmography

Film

Television

References

External links
 

1977 births
2019 suicides
21st-century American male actors
American conspiracy theorists
American male actors
Male actors from New Mexico
People from Albuquerque, New Mexico
Suicides by jumping in the United States
Suicides in Arizona
2019 deaths
QAnon